Hilary Greaves (born 1978) is a British philosopher, currently serving as professor of philosophy at the University of Oxford and director of the Global Priorities Institute, a research centre for effective altruism at that university supported by the Open Philanthropy Project.

Education
Greaves earned a BA in philosophy and physics from Oxford in 2003, and a PhD in philosophy from Rutgers in 2008.  Her doctoral thesis was titled Spacetime Symmetries and the CPT Theorem, and was supervised by Frank Arntzenius. She has held appointments at Merton College and Somerville College and, since 2016, has been a professor of philosophy at Oxford.

Research
Greaves' current work is on issues related to effective altruism, particularly in connection to global prioritisation. Her research interests include moral philosophy (including foundational issues in consequentialism, interpersonal aggregation, population ethics, and moral uncertainty), formal epistemology, and the philosophy of physics, particularly quantum mechanics.

Selected publications

Books
Greaves, Hilary, and Theron Pummer (eds). Effective Altruism: Philosophical Issues.  Oxford University Press,  2019.

Peer-reviewed articles
Greaves, Hilary. 2013. "Epistemic Decision Theory". Mind. 122, no. 488: 915-952.
Greaves, Hilary, and David Wallace. 2006. "Justifying conditionalization: Conditionalization maximizes expected epistemic utility". Mind. 115, no. 459: 607-631.
Greaves, Hilary. 2010. "Towards a Geometrical Understanding of the CPT Theorem". The British Journal for the Philosophy of Science. 61, no. 1: 27–50. (Winner of the James T. Cushing Memorial Prize in History and Philosophy of Physics.)

References

External links
 Official website
 

1978 births
21st-century British non-fiction writers
21st-century British philosophers
21st-century British women writers
21st-century essayists
Alumni of the University of Oxford
Analytic philosophers
British ethicists
British women essayists
British women non-fiction writers
British women philosophers
Consequentialists
Contemporary philosophers
Epistemologists
Fellows of Merton College, Oxford
Fellows of Somerville College, Oxford
Living people
People associated with effective altruism
Philosophers of mind
Philosophers of science
Rutgers University alumni
Utilitarians
Writers about activism and social change